Steve Banks may refer to:

 Steve Banks (footballer) (born 1972), English football player and coach
 Steve Banks (photographer) (born 1938), American photographer, artist and director

See also
 Steven Banks (born 1954), American musician, comedian, actor and writer